Xinghe County (Mongolian:   Siŋhė siyan, Шинхэ шянь) is a county of south-central Inner Mongolia, People's Republic of China, bordering the provinces of Hebei to the east and Shanxi to the south. It is under the administration of Ulanqab City, and is situated on the China National Highway 110 between Ulanqab and Zhangjiakou in Hebei province. Bordering county-level divisions include Fengzhen City to the southwest, Chahar Right Front Banner to the west, Chahar Right Back Banner to the northwest, and Shangdu County to the north.

Climate

References

External links 

 
 www.xzqh.org 

County-level divisions of Inner Mongolia
Ulanqab